Clathurella verrucosa is a species of sea snail, a marine gastropod mollusk in the family Clathurellidae.

Original description
   Stahlschmidt P., Poppe G.T. & Tagaro S.P. (2018). Descriptions of remarkable new turrid species from the Philippines. Visaya. 5(1): 5-64.
page(s): 8, pl. 3 figs 1-2.

References

verrucosa
Gastropods described in 2018